JPG or JPEG, is a method of compression for digital images.

JPG may also refer to:

JPG (magazine), a print-on-demand magazine
Jefferson Proving Ground, near Madison, Indiana, U.S., a munitions testing facility 
JPG by Gaultier, a fashion label of Jean-Paul Gaultier

See also

JPEG (disambiguation)